A Ferrarese is a citizen of Ferrara, Italy.

It may also refer to:

People
 Adriana Ferrarese del Bene, an Italian operatic soprano. 
 Don Ferrarese, former Major League Baseball pitcher
 Enrique Ferrarese, an Italian Argentine real estate developer
 Luigi Ferrarese, an Italian physician
 Claudio Ferrarese, an Italian footballer

Other
 Coppia ferrarese, a type of sourdough bread
 Ferrarese dialect of Emilian, spoken in the Province of Ferrara

See also
 Ferrara